Hohovica is a small settlement northwest of Gabrovka in the Municipality of Litija in central Slovenia. The area is part of the traditional region of Lower Carniola. It is now included with the rest of the municipality in the Central Sava Statistical Region; until January 2014 the municipality was part of the Central Slovenia Statistical Region.

Archaeological finds in the area, dating to the Iron Age, point to the possible site of a hill fort on Gradišče Hill in the southeastern part of the settlement.

References

External links
Hohovica on Geopedia

Populated places in the Municipality of Litija